The 2018 Santos Women's Tour Down Under was a women's cycle stage race held in Australia from 11 to 14 January, 2018. The Women's Tour Down Under, being held for the seventh time, was held as a UCI rating of 2.1 race, having been a 2.2 race in 2017.

The race was won for the second year in succession – becoming the first rider to win multiple Tour Down Under races – by  rider Amanda Spratt. Spratt placed third on the stage to Mengler Hill, and assumed the race leader's ochre jersey the following day by winning the stage into Hahndorf. With her above finishes on hill-top stages, Spratt won the polka-dot jersey for the mountains classification, while Garfoot won the sprints classification and its green jersey on the final day in Adelaide, winning all four intermediate sprints during the stage.

The race's other jersey, the white jersey, went to Grace Anderson of the New Zealand national team, as the best-placed rider – in ninth overall – under the age of 25.  won the teams classification, after placing Spratt, Lucy Kennedy and Annemiek van Vleuten in the top-six overall.

Teams
17 teams participated in the 2018 Women's Tour Down Under.

Route
The race route was announced on 22 November 2017.

Stages

Stage 1
11 January 2018 — Gumeracha to Gumeracha,

Stage 2
12 January 2018 — Lyndoch to Mengler Hill,

Stage 3
13 January 2018 — The Bend Motorsport Park to Hahndorf,

Stage 4
14 January 2018 — Adelaide,

Classification leadership table
In the 2018 Women's Tour Down Under, four different jerseys were awarded. For the general classification, calculated by adding each cyclist's finishing times on each stage, and allowing time bonuses for the first three finishers at intermediate sprints and at the finish of mass-start stages, the leader received an ochre jersey. This classification was considered the most important of the 2018 Women's Tour Down Under, and the winner of the classification was considered the winner of the race.

Additionally, there was a sprints classification, which awarded a green jersey. In the sprints classification, cyclists received points for finishing in the top 8 in a stage. For winning a stage, a rider earned 16 points, with 12 for second, 8 for third, 6 for fourth, with one point fewer per place down to 2 points for 8th place. Points towards the classification could also be accrued – awarded on a 5–3–2 scale – at intermediate sprint points during each stage; these intermediate sprints also offered bonus seconds towards the general classification as noted above. There was also a mountains classification, the leadership of which was marked by a white jersey with navy polka dots. In the mountains classification, points were won by reaching the top of a climb before other cyclists, with more points available for the higher-categorised climbs.

The fourth jersey represented the young rider classification, marked by a white jersey. This was decided in the same way as the general classification, but only riders born after 1 January 1993 were eligible to be ranked in the classification. There was also a classification for teams, in which the times of the best three cyclists per team on each stage were added together; the leading team at the end of the race was the team with the lowest total time.

References

External links

2018 in Australian sport
January 2018 sports events in Australia